Andorra, officially the Principality of Andorra, also called the Principality of the Valleys of Andorra<ref>Funk and Wagnalls Encyclopedia##, 1993</ref>, is a sovereign landlocked microstate in Southwestern Europe, located in the eastern Pyrenees mountains and bordered by Spain and France.

9th to 19th centuries
Andorra claims it is the last independent survivor of the Marca Hispanica, the buffer states created by Charlemagne to keep the Islamic Moors from advancing into Christian France. Tradition holds that Charlemagne granted a charter to the Andorran people in return for their fighting the Moors. In the 9th century, Charlemagne's grandson, Charles the Bald, named the Count of Urgell as overlord of Andorra. A descendant of the count later gave the lands to the Diocese of Urgell.

In the 11th century, fearing military action by neighboring lords, the Bishop of Urgell placed himself under the protection of the Lord of Caboet, a Catalan nobleman. Later, the Count of Foix became heir to the Lord of Caboet through marriage to Ermessenda de Castellbò in 1208, and a dispute arose between the Occitan Count and the Catalan bishop over Andorra.

In 1278, the conflict was resolved by the signing of a pareage (pariatges''), which provided that Andorra's sovereignty be shared between the Count of Foix and the Bishop of La Seu d'Urgell (Catalonia). The pareage, a feudal institution recognizing the principle of equality of rights shared by two rulers, gave the small state its territory and political form. Andorra's borders have remained unchanged since 1278.

Andorra was briefly annexed to the Crown of Aragon twice, in 1396 and 1512.

20th and 21st centuries

Andorra did not officially participate in World War I, although there were three Andorran volunteers who fought: Valentí Naudi, Josep Estany and René Huguet. North American newspapers in 1958 claimed that Andorra had declared war on Germany in 1914 but failed to sign a peace treaty until 1958, and this claim has appeared in later sources, but there appears to be no contemporary evidence of such declaration. In 2014, the news outlet Ràdio i Televisió d'Andorra investigated the 1958 claim and could find no documentation of any original declaration of war. Historian Pere Cavero could only find an exchange of letters between the German consul in Marseille and the Catalan Ombudsman, where the former asks if there is a state of war with Andorra and the latter responds they could find nothing in their archive to indicate this.

In 1933, France occupied Andorra as a result of social unrest before elections. On 12 July 1934 an adventurer named Boris Skossyreff issued a proclamation in Urgel, declaring himself Boris I, sovereign prince of Andorra, simultaneously declaring war on the Bishop of Urgell. He was arrested by Spanish authorities on 20 July and ultimately expelled from Spain. From 1936 to 1940, a French detachment was garrisoned in Andorra to prevent encroachment as a result of the Spanish Civil War and Francoist Spain.

During World War II, Andorra remained neutral and was an important smuggling route from Spain into France. The French Resistance used Andorra as part of their route to get downed airmen out of France.

In 1943, Andorra carried out its first execution since the 19th century: Antoni Arenis was executed for double fratricide by firing squad because a trained executioner was unavailable to operate the legal method, by garrote.

Long an impoverished land with little contact with any nations other than adjoining France and Spain, Andorra, after World War II, achieved considerable prosperity through a developing tourist industry. That development, abetted by improvements in transport and communications, has tended to break down Andorra's isolation and to bring Andorrans into the mainstream of European history. Public demands for democratic reforms led to the extension of the franchise to women in the 1970s and to the creation of new and more fully autonomous organs of government in the early 1980s.

Since the 1990s
Andorra formally became a parliamentary democracy in May 1993 following approval of a new constitution by a popular referendum in March 1993. The new constitution retained the French and Spanish co-princes although with reduced and narrowly defined powers. Civil rights were greatly expanded, including the legalisation of political parties and the provision for an independent judiciary. Andorra joined a customs union with the European Communities (now the European Union) in 1991 and was admitted to the United Nations on 28 July 1993. It became a member of the Council of Europe in 1994. The country has been seeking ways to improve its export potential and increase its economic ties with its European neighbours. The financial services sector of the economy is highly important because of Andorra's status as a tax haven and its banking secrecy laws.

See also
 List of Co-Princes of Andorra
 History of Europe
 History of Catalonia
 History of France
 History of Spain

Notes

External links

Geography and History of the Principality of Andorra
History of Andorra: Primary Documents
Background Note: Andorra
Rulers of Andorra

 
1930s in France
Andorra